Nosiri Khusrav District (Nohiya-i Nosiri Khusrav), is a district located in the south-western corner of Khatlon Region of Tajikistan on the Amu Darya. It shares borders with Uzbekistan to the west, Afghanistan to the south and the Shahrtuz District to the north and east. The population of the district is 39,300 (January 2020 estimate). Until 2004 it was called Beshkent District; then renamed in honor of the 11th century Persian-Tajik poet Nosiri Khusrav (sometimes also Khisrav). The district capital is Bahori, a village at the northernmost tip of the district.

Beshkent is a lowland 70 kilometers in length and 5 kilometers in width—dry without any reliable source of water. beshkent is the warmest valley in Tajikistan, with average temperatures in January and July of 3 °C and 31 °C respectively. The annual average precipitation is 140 millimeters.

Administrative divisions
They are as follows:

References

Districts of Khatlon Region
Districts of Tajikistan